Shaul Olmert (born 1975) is an Israeli entrepreneur and business executive. He is the co-founder and chief executive officer of Piggy (AKA: Flying Pigs LTD.), a stealth mode start up based in Tel Aviv, Israel. Prior to Piggy, he was the co-founder of Playbuzz, an online content publishing platform where he served as chief executive officer for 8 years before stepping down and assuming a new role as the company's president. He has been involved in numerous other startups including NetAlign, GameGround, and Sundaysky. Olmert also worked as an executive with Nickelodeon/MTV Networks and Conduit.

Early life and education

Olmert grew up in Israel. As a child he liked to develop computer programs and build machines out of electrical circuits from old radio transistors and walkie-talkie type gadgets. His grandparents Bella and Mordechai Olmert came to Palestine in 1933 after escaping from Odessa during the Russian Civil War in 1919. They traveled to China prior to settling in 1930s Palestine. His father is former Israeli Prime Minister Ehud Olmert. He  served in the Israeli Army. After his service, Olmert worked as a high school teacher in Jerusalem where he taught computers, prior to moving to New York to attend college. He went on to attend New York University where he earned a master's degree in Interactive Telecommunications.

Career

Olmert began his business executive career as the director of business partnerships at Oberon Media prior to beginning his career for Nickelodeon/MTV Networks. Olmert worked as the vice president of digital products for MTV Networks, primarily with MTV Games. During his time with MTV he was in charge of adapting its television properties for the digital game industry. Olmert left MTV in 2007 and served as president and chief marketing officer of SundaySky prior to joining Conduit as that company's chief marketing officer.

In 2008, Olmert co-founded GameGround, a social network for gamers that sends game updates such as high scores to members through a feed. It also provides tips and tricks for playing various video games.

In 2012, Olmert founded the online content publishing platform Playbuzz with Tom Pachys, launching the website in December 2013. The website allows users, digital publishers, and brands to generate content in formats generally associated with viral media, including lists, quizzes, polls, ranked lists, and trivia that can be shared via social media or embedded elsewhere on the web. By September 2014, seven of the 10 biggest stories on Facebook involved content that originated on Playbuzz. The company took over the number one spot as the most shared publisher on Facebook in November 2014 with approximately 9 million shares. It was also listed by Inc. as one of the 15 Israeli Startups Getting Hot at the Turn of 2015. In October 2019, he stepped down as CEO.

Since September 2020 he is the co-founder and chief executive officer of Piggy (AKA: Flying Pigs LTD.), a stealth mode start up based in Tel Aviv, Israel.

References

External links
 
 Playbuzz official website

Children of prime ministers of Israel
Israeli emigrants to the United States
Israeli businesspeople
Living people
1975 births
Shaul
New York University alumni